Tattooed on My Brain is the 24th studio album by the Scottish hard rock band Nazareth. It was released on 12 October 2018 by Frontiers Records. It was produced by Yann Rouiller who also worked with Nazareth on their previous albums, The Newz (2008) and Rock 'n' Roll Telephone (2014). It is the first Nazareth album to feature new vocalist Carl Sentance, replacing original singer Dan McCafferty who had to leave the band in 2013 due to health issues.

Track listing

Personnel
Nazareth
Carl Sentance – lead vocals
Jimmy Murrison – guitars
Pete Agnew – bass guitar, backing vocals; lead vocals on "You Call Me"
Lee Agnew – drums

Charts

References

External links
 Tattooed on My Brain on AllMusic

Nazareth (band) albums
2018 albums
Frontiers Records albums